Pagnath is a village development committee in Dailekh District in the Bheri Zone of western-central Nepal. At the time of the 1991 Nepal census it had a population of 2044 people living in 341 individual households.

References

External links
UN map of the municipalities of Dailekh District

Populated places in Dailekh District